Radio 107.5 (formerly known as E-FM 107.5 and before that Easy FM) was a Swedish radio station that was started in 1999 when SBS Broadcasting Group bought the license for the 107.5 MHz spot in the Stockholm area from Sky Radio. The radiostation stopped broadcasting since early 2020.

It played modern dance and electronic music with a "dance beat".
The station features many Swedish artists such as Avicii, along with many upcoming producers in the electronic scene.

External links
Prosieben
Official website

Radio stations in Sweden
ProSiebenSat.1 Media
Defunct mass media in Sweden
Radio stations established in 1999
Radio stations disestablished in 2010